The Coat of arms of Udmurtia is one of the official state symbols of Udmurtia.

The coat of arms consists of a round red-and-black shield, on which there is a white swan with spread wings. 
In the emblem, black represents stability and earth; red life and the sun; and white moral purity and space.

The white swan is a symbol of revival, wisdom and perfection. It is based on the mythology of the Udmurt people and other nations of Udmurtia. The solar signs are meant to protect man from misfortune.

The designer of the national emblem of the Udmurt Republic is Y.Lobanov.

See also

 Flag of Udmurtia

External links 
 Coat of Arms

Udmurtia
Culture of Udmurtia
Udmutia